Belogorsky is a rural locality (a khutor) and the administrative center of Belogorskoye Rural Settlement, Kumylzhensky District, Volgograd Oblast, Russia. The population was 713 as of 2010. There are 7 streets.

Geography 
Belogorsky is located on Khopyorsko-Buzulukskaya Plain, 58 km west of Kumylzhenskaya (the district's administrative centre) by road. Lyubishensky is the nearest rural locality.

References 

Rural localities in Kumylzhensky District